Transports Schiocchet Excursions is a French bus company that runs a bus route from Moselle to Luxembourg.

, it is involved in litigation against ten cleaning women who share car journeys to work on the same route, accusing them of "unfair and parasitical competition", demanding financial damages and the confiscation of the cleaning women's cars. The lawsuit has been widely derided, and has been described on Groklaw as "the stupidest lawsuit since the world began".

Although the company has already lost once in the Briey commercial tribunal, it is now pursuing the women in a higher court, the Court of Bankruptcy.

External links
The Stupidest Lawsuit Since the World Began - Groklaw
Bus firm takes car sharers to court - Guardian
Préférer sa voiture au bus peut vous conduire au tribunal - Libération (in French; Google translation)
89/524/EEC: Commission Decision of 7 September 1989 on a dispute between Luxembourg and France on the establishment of a special regular passenger service between these two States: an earlier dispute involving Transports Schiocchet Excursions

Anti-competitive practices
Bus companies of France